Metascience is a triannual peer-reviewed academic journal published by Springer Nature. It publishes reviews of books in the history and philosophy of science and science and technology studies.

It was established in 1984 by the Australasian Association for the History, Philosophy and Social Studies of Science, and re-established in 1991 as a new series of the journal, with the new subtitle An International Review Journal for the History, Philosophy and Social Studies of Science, by Michael Shortland. Operations for the journal moved in 2017 from the philosophy department of the State University of New York at Oswego to the Centre for Science Studies at Aarhus University.

, the editors-in-chief are K. Brad Wray of Aarhus University and Jonathan Simon of the University of Lorraine. The journal is abstracted and indexed in Scopus.

See also
 Metascience

References

External links

Multidisciplinary humanities journals
Triannual journals
Springer Science+Business Media academic journals
English-language journals
Publications established in 1992